Abigail Elizabeth Smith, (born January 16, 1995) known professionally as Yebba, is an American singer and songwriter from West Memphis, Arkansas. She first became known for her backing vocal performance on Chance the Rapper's SNL performance of the song "Same Drugs" in 2016 and releasing her debut single "Evergreen" in 2017. She has collaborated with a number of artists, including PJ Morton, Sam Smith, Mark Ronson, Stormzy, Ed Sheeran, A$AP Rocky, and Drake.

Career
In 2017, Yebba revealed that she was co-signed by Ed Sheeran's record label Gingerbread Man Records when she performed a song called "My Mind", which was written and performed about a week before her mother died. Sheeran described how the Sofar Sounds performance of the song was so powerful, it made him cry. Shortly after followed the official release of her debut single "Evergreen". About the song, she said "I grew up doing music in my dad's church from a baby, so I've spent about a seventh of my life on the front row, beside my momma, and right behind my dad's organ. Church has always been a place of honesty, questioning, and family. So after we saw mom's suicide, and that sense of family seemingly dissolved, a building I had become entirely estranged to seemed like the only place I could go." Later that year, she collaborated with Sam Smith on the song "No Peace", which was released through Smith's 2017 album The Thrill of It All.

In 2018, she collaborated with Zane Lowe to release her debut music video for her debut single "Evergreen", which was done so with support from Apple Music and Beats 1. Lowe stated about the music video, "YEBBA is an artist in every sense of the word, and working together to bring her vision to light was truly remarkable.  She has one of the more powerful and exciting voices to come along in years, and we are excited to introduce her to the world". She also appeared as a featured artist, alongside Maverick Sabre on Rudimental's promotional single "They Don't Care About Us", which served as a track from their 2019 album Toast to Our Differences. Additionally, she was a backing vocalist on the recent projects from Jess Glynne and Mumford & Sons.

In 2019, Yebba was nominated and won her first ever Grammy for Best Traditional R&B Performance of the song "How Deep Is Your Love", alongside PJ Morton at the 61st Annual Grammy Awards. She also appeared on three songs from Mark Ronson's album Late Night Feelings. In April, she appeared as a guest vocalist alongside The Staves for Mumford & Sons' live performance of the song "Beloved" on The Jonathan Ross Show. In June, she was revealed to have a featured appearance on Ed Sheeran's collaborative effort No.6 Collaborations Project on a song entitled "Best Part of Me", which was eventually released as a promotional single. The song became her first charted release, peaking at 99 in the US Charts. In August, she released her follow up single to "Evergreen", entitled "Where Do You Go". The song was produced by BJ Burton and The Picard Brothers.

In May 2020, Yebba signed to RCA Records and released her first single, the Mark Ronson produced "Distance".

In September 2021, Yebba appeared on the highly anticipated album Certified Lover Boy by Drake on a song entitled "Yebba's Heartbreak". The song serves as the album's interlude.

Personal life
Yebba has been spoken advocate for mental health awareness and support. Her mother died by suicide about a week after Yebba sang her first original song, causing "My Mind" to take on new meaning representing mental health. She says her artist name was chosen to honor her mother, who she said "always called her by the nickname" (her name Abbey written backwards) as a child. In memory of her mother, Yebba gave the song away free through her website. Smith attended Belmont University in Nashville, TN.

Artistry
Yebba cites The Clark Sisters as her heroes and number one influences. She wrote on Instagram: "This family's music made me come to know Jesus. Anything I've learned about singing has been from trying to mimic them." Records like "Nothing to Lose," "Jesus Lifted Me," "You Brought the Sunshine," "The Darkest Hour is Just Before the Day" and "Jesus is a Love Song" are some of her favorites.

Discography

Studio albums

Singles

As lead artist

As featured artist

Featured appearances

Guest appearances

Songwriting credits

Awards and nominations

References

Living people
Grammy Award winners
American women singer-songwriters
People from West Memphis, Arkansas
Mental health activists
1995 births
21st-century American women
Singer-songwriters from Arkansas
RCA Records artists